On the interpretation of Nature (or Thoughts on the interpretation of Nature, French: Pensees sur l'interpretation de la nature) is a 1754 book written by Denis Diderot.

In this work Diderot expounds on his views about nature, evolution, materialism, mathematics, and experimental science.

Content

Nature and Evolution
The book begins with the statement: "It is nature that I wish to describe [ecrire]; nature is the only book for the philosopher." Diderot conceives of nature as operating on matter and giving rise to various life forms.

In the cosmic laboratory of nature, writes Diderot, numerous species have arisen and perished. As conceptualized by Diderot, Nature works on the life forms it has given rise to by improving upon or discarding specific organs of the life form. Everything is matter; matter includes within it the potential of consciousness; body and soul are one and die together. Nature cares for the species rather than for the individual; it lets the individual reproduce and then die. Nature is neutral and blind; she makes no distinction between saints and sinners, and destroys both fools and philosophers.

On the question of evolution, Diderot writes:

Mathematics and Experimental Science
The book extolls the natural sciences and the role played by experience    in developing the natural sciences. It denounces mathematics, more specifically it criticizes the kind of mathematics which yields no new knowledge and is "useless". It is critical of "useless experiments" and mathematical assumptions that are contrary to the laws of nature; and the approach of treating mathematics as a game that has nothing to do with nature. Mathematicians like to criticize other thinkers for being metaphysicians, writes Diderot, but increasingly chemists, physicists, and naturalists are directing the same criticism at them.

In his book, Diderot focuses on the role of conjecture in the natural sciences. By conjecture Diderot means the ability of an experimental philosopher to "sniff out" new methods and processes; he examines the question of whether this ability can be passed on from one person to another.

References

Notes

Denis Diderot